Charlotte Hedges is a British DJ and broadcaster, who presents as part of "Rickie, Melvin and Charlie" on BBC Radio 1.

Early life
Hedges studied journalism at Harlow College.

Career

Radio presenting
Hedges hosted the breakfast show at Kiss for ten years with Rickie Haywood-Williams and Melvin Odoom. The trio are known as Rickie, Melvin and Charlie. In November 2018, it was announced that they would move to BBC Radio 1 to replace Charlie Sloth in the mid-evening slot. Their new show debuted on 1 April 2019. On 20 April 2021, it was announced that the trio would be moving to the mid-morning slot then occupied by Clara Amfo, who would take over the early evening slot from Annie Mac.

In September 2020, it was announced that Hedges would replace MistaJam as the host of Radio 1's Dance Anthems on Saturday afternoons. She took over the following month.

DJ
Hedges has performed DJ sets at various clubs and festivals. In 2014, she released a single titled "Best Night OML" with vocals from JB Gill. In 2016, she released a single titled "Kaleidoscope" on Armada Deep featuring vocalist Sonny Reeves.

Personal life 
On 8 March 2022, Hedges announced on the Radio 1 Breakfast show that she was pregnant.

References

External links
Rickie, Melvin and Charlie (BBC Radio 1)
Radio 1's Dance Anthems (BBC Radio 1)

BBC Radio 1 presenters
English women DJs
Living people
1986 births